Love Don't Run is the third studio album by American country music artist Steve Holy. It was released on September 13, 2011 via Curb Records. The album includes an acoustic version of Holy's 2001 number one single, "Good Morning Beautiful."

"If It Gets You Where You Wanna Go" was covered by Canadian country music artist Dallas Smith on his debut album Jumped Right In and released as a single in March 2012.

Track listing

Personnel
Jim "Moose" Brown- Hammond B-3 organ, piano
Steve Bryant- bass guitar
Thom Flora- background vocals
Steve Hinson- steel guitar
Steve Holy- lead vocals
Mike Johnson- steel guitar
Wayne Killius- drums, percussion
Troy Lancaster- electric guitar
James Mitchell- electric guitar
Jimmy Nichols- strings
Mike Rojas- Hammond B-3 organ, piano
Curt Ryle- acoustic guitar
Wanda Vick- fiddle
Dennis Wage- piano
Biff Watson- acoustic guitar
Scott Williamson- drums, percussion

Chart performance

Album

Singles

References

2011 albums
Steve Holy albums
Curb Records albums